Adhartal railway station is a railway station in Jabalpur city of Madhya Pradesh. Its code is ADTL. It serves Adhartal town. The station consists of two platforms. Passenger, Express and Superfast trains halt here.

Major trains

 Adhartal–Habibganj Intercity Express
 Narmada Express

References

Railway stations in Jabalpur district
Jabalpur railway division
Transport in Jabalpur